Kate was a British drama television series which originally aired on ITV in 38 episodes between 6 January 1970 and 29 November 1972. It starred Phyllis Calvert in the role of an agony aunt who becomes personally drawn into the problems of the people who send letters to her. It was made by Yorkshire Television.

Cast 
 Phyllis Calvert as Kate Graham
 Elizabeth Burger as Ellen Burwood
 Penelope Keith as Wenda Padbury
 Jack Hedley as Donald Killearn
 Preston Lockwood as Mr. Winch
 Gareth Forwood as Peter Hemmings
 Jasmina Hilton as Sally Hart

References

External links 
 

1970s British drama television series
1970 British television series debuts
1972 British television series endings
ITV television dramas
Television series by ITV Studios
Television series by Yorkshire Television
English-language television shows
Television shows set in London